Rho railway station is a railway station in Italy, that serves the town of Rho. It is a junction of the Turin–Milan railway with the lines to Domodossola, to Luino and to Porto Ceresio. The train services are operated by Trenord.

Train services
The station is served by the following services:

Milan Metropolitan services (S5) Varese - Rho - Milan - Treviglio
Milan Metropolitan services (S6) Novara - Rho - Milan - Treviglio
Milan Metropolitan services (S11) Rho - Milan - Monza - Seregno - Como - Chiasso

See also
 Milan suburban railway service

References

External links

Railway stations in Lombardy
Railway stations opened in 1858
Milan S Lines stations
1858 establishments in Italy
Railway stations in Italy opened in the 19th century